Gottfrid Johansson (16 March 1891 – 14 April 1962) was a Swedish international football forward and bandy player.

As a footballer, Johansson was part of the Djurgården Swedish champions' team of 1915, 1917, and 1920. Johansson made three appearances for Sweden and scored one goals He made his debut in a friendly against Norway in 1914, in which he also scored his only international goal.

As a bandy player, Johansson was part of the Djurgården Swedish champions' team in bandy of 1908 and 1912.

Honours

Football 
Djurgårdens IF
 Svenska Mästerskapet: 1915, 1917, 1920

Bandy 
Djurgårdens IF
 Svenska Mästerskapet: 1908, 1912

References

External links 

1891 births
1962 deaths
Swedish footballers
Association football forwards
Sweden international footballers
Djurgårdens IF Fotboll players
Swedish bandy players
Djurgårdens IF Bandy players